La Caixa (La Caixa Headquarters) is a complex of three buildings, including two skyscrapers in Barcelona, Spain. Completed in 1974. La Caixa 1 has 26 floors and rises 85 meters, La Caixa 2 has 14 floors and rises 48 meters. La Caixa 3 is not a tall building, and is in the form of a cube. The buildings are headquarters of La Caixa bank.

Maria Cristina station, on Barcelona Metro line L3, and Trambaix tram lines T1, T2 and T3, lies immediately in front of the headquarters complex.

See also 

 List of tallest buildings and structures in Barcelona
 Avinguda Diagonal

References 

Skyscraper office buildings in Barcelona
Buildings and structures completed in 1974
Headquarters in Spain